The Survey Office of Western Australia commenced as early as 1829, making the succeeding agency, the Department of Lands and Surveys, one of the oldest government agencies in Western Australia.

 Department of Lands and Surveys - (DOLS) -   1 January 1890 -  1 July 1986
 Department of Land Administration - (DOLA) - 1 July 1986    -  1 July 2003
 Department of Land Information - (DLI) -     1 July 2003    -  1 January 2007
 Landgate (officially the Western Australian Land Information Authority) - 1 January 2007

See also 
 Surveyor General of Western Australia

References

External links 
 
 

Lands